Michael L. Pesce (born March 1, 1943) is an American politician who served in the New York State Assembly from the 52nd district from 1973 to 1980.

References

1943 births
Living people
20th-century American politicians
Democratic Party members of the New York State Assembly
People from the Province of Bari